The 1969–70 La Liga was the 39th season since its establishment. The season started on September 13, 1969, and finished on April 19, 1970.

Team locations

League table

Results

Pichichi Trophy

References
 Spanish Final Table 1969-70
 Primera División 1969/70

External links
 Official LFP Site

1969 1970
1969–70 in Spanish football leagues
Spain